The following is an incomplete list of Linux audio software.

Audio players

GStreamer-based 
 Amarok is a free music player for Linux and other Unix-like operating systems. Multiple backends are supported (xine, helix and NMM).
 Banshee is a free audio player for Linux which uses the GStreamer multimedia platforms to play, encode, and decode Ogg Vorbis, MP3, and other formats. Banshee supports playing and importing audio CDs and playing and synchronizing music with iPods. Audioscrobbler API support.
 Clementine is a cross-platform, open-source, Qt based audio player, written in C++. It can play Internet radio streams; managing some media devices, playlists; supports visualizations, Audioscrobbler API. It was made as a spin-off of Amarok 1.4 and is a rougher version of said program.
 Exaile is a free software audio player for Unix-like operating systems that aims to be functionally similar to KDE’s Amarok. Unlike Amarok, Exaile is a Python program and uses the GTK toolkit.
 Guayadeque Music Player is a free and open-source audio player written in C++ using the wxWidgets toolkit.
 Muine is an audio player for the GNOME desktop environment. Muine is written in C# using Mono and Gtk#. The default backend is GStreamer framework but Muine can also use xine libraries.
 Quod Libet is a GTK based audio player, written in Python, using GStreamer or Xine as back ends. Its distinguishing features are a rigorous approach to tagging (making it especially popular with classical music fans) and a flexible approach to music library management. It supports regular expression and Boolean algebra-based searches, and is stated to perform efficiently with music libraries of tens of thousands of tracks.
 Rhythmbox is an audio player inspired by Apple iTunes.
 Songbird is a cross-platform, open-source media player and web browser. It is built using code from the Firefox web browser. The graphical user interface (GUI) is very similar to Apple iTunes, and it can sync with Apple iPods. Like Firefox, Songbird is extensible via downloadable add-ons. It's able to display lyrics retrieved from the net, and also the ones embedded through metadata (ID3v2 tag) after adding the LyricMaster plug-in. Linux official support for Songbird was discontinued in April, 2010. But in December, 2011 a group of programmers forked it openly as Nightingale.

Music Player Daemon based 
 Cantata is a Qt-based front-end for Music Player Daemon.
 Ario is a light GTK2 client to MPD

Other 
 aTunes is a free, cross-platform audio player for operating systems supporting the programming language Java (Unix-like: Linux, BSD, Macintosh), and Windows. aTunes can also play Internet radio streams and automatically display associated artist information, song videos, and song lyrics.
 Audacious is a free media player for Linux or Linux-based systems. It can be expanded via plug-ins, including support for all popular codecs. On most systems a useful set of plug-ins is installed by default, supporting MP3, Ogg Vorbis and FLAC files. Audacious' classic interface looks and feels very similar to Winamp. It is compatible with LADSPA plug-ins.
 cmus is a small and fast text-mode music player for Linux and many other Unix-like operating systems.
 DeaDBeeF (as in 0xDEADBEEF) is a modular audio player for Linux, *BSD, OpenSolaris, macOS, and other UNIX-like systems.
 JuK is a free software audio player for KDE, the default player since KDE 3.2. JuK supports collections of MP3, Ogg Vorbis, and FLAC audio files.
 mpg123 is a real time MPEG 1.0/2.0/2.5 audio player/decoder for layers 1, 2 and 3 (MPEG 1.0 layer 3 a.k.a. MP3 most commonly tested). Among others working with Linux, Mac OS X, FreeBSD, SunOS4.1.3, Solaris 2.5, HPUX 9.x, SGI Irix and Cygwin or plain Windows. It is free software licensed under LGPL 2.1
 Music on Console (MOC) is an ncurses-based console audio player. It is designed to be powerful and easy to use, and its command structure and window layouts are similar to the Midnight Commander console file manager. It is very configurable, with Advanced Linux Sound Architecture (ALSA), Open Sound System (OSS) or JACK Audio Connection Kit (JACK) outputs, customizable color schemes, interface layouts, key bindings, and tag parsing.
 Sound eXchange (SoX) is a cross-platform command-line audio editor.
 X MultiMedia System (XMMS) is a GTK1-based multimedia player which works on many platforms, but has some features which only work under Linux. XMMS can play media files such as .ogg, MP3, MOD's, WAV and others with the use of input plug-ins. It is a free software audio player similar to Winamp that runs on many Unix-like operating systems. However, development of XMMS has been deprecated in favor of XMMS2, a new audio player built from scratch on the more modern GTK2 libraries. See also Audacious on this page as a successor to the historic XMMS.
 Tomahawk is a cross-platform music player built with social media and multi-source music streaming in mind. It features support for services like Spotify, Grooveshark, Dilandau, SoundCloud, 4shared, Jamendo, Last.fm, Ampache, Owncloud, Ex.fm and Subsonic.

Distributions and add-ons 
 dyne:bolic
 Musix GNU+Linux
 Planet CCRMA, an add-on for Red Hat Linux with many tools and system mods
 puredyne (Ubuntu based)
 Ubuntu Studio, an Ubuntu-based distribution geared toward multimedia
 AVLinux (Debian-based)

Graphical programming 
 Pure Data (Pd), graphical programming language.

Audio programming languages (text-based)
 ChucK, an audio programming language for realtime synthesis, composition, and performance.
 Csound, composition, synthesis and processing.
 Nyquist, Lisp-based language for sound generation and analysis. Audacity supports plug-ins written in Nyquist.
 Sonic Pi, live coding and performance
 SuperCollider, a language like Smalltalk for real-time audio synthesis.

DJ tools 
 Mixxx is a cross-platform and DJ package supporting a wide range of file formats, MIDI/HID controllers and timecode vinyl.
 xwax

Drum machines 
 Hydrogen, drum machine and sequencer

Recording, editing and mastering

Digital audio workstations (DAWs)

 Ardour, a multi-track audio recorder. GPLv2+
 LMMS, music composer. GPL
 Qtractor, a full featured multitrack digital audio workstation (DAW), with audio and MIDI sequencer. GPL
 REAPER, a proprietary multitrack audio, MIDI recording and mastering software.
 Rosegarden, MIDI sequencer. GPL
 Tracktion, proprietary and commercial digital audio workstation.
 Traverso DAW, a multi-track audio recorder. GPL
 Harrison Mixbus and Mixbus32C, proprietary.
 Bitwig Studio, proprietary and commercial digital audio workstation.
 Renoise, a digital audio workstation (DAW) based upon the heritage and development of tracker software.

Audio editors and recorders
 Audacity, audio editor and recorder.
 [Audio Recorder], simple audio recorder, still offers events to trigger or stop recording
 Ecasound, audio recorder.
 Jokosher, audio editor.
 Ocenaudio (https://www.ocenaudio.com/features)  free  audio editor and recorder 
 Sound eXchange (SoX).
 Sweep, audio editor.
 WaveSurfer

Sequencers

 MilkyTracker, an old-school tracker.
 MusE, MIDI-audio sequencer.
 Renoise, commercial modern tracker-style sequencer.
 Rosegarden, a music composition and editing environment based on a MIDI sequencer.
 Seq24, a loop based midi sequencer.

Other
 Baudline, signal analyzer.
 Buzztrax, music composer.
 Gnome Wave Cleaner, denoise, dehiss and amplify.
 Impro-Visor, edit and playback jazz solos over chord changes and rhythm.
 LinuxSampler, sampler.
 Mp3gain, adjust MP3 playback volume without re-encoding.

Sound servers 
 aRts, the KDE 3 soundserver.
 Phonon, the multimedia framework provided by Qt 4 and used in KDE 4.
 Enlightened Sound Daemon (EsounD, ESD).
 JACK Audio Connection Kit (JACK), real-time sound server.
 Network Audio System (NAS).
 Network-Integrated Multimedia Middleware (NMM).
 PulseAudio, a sound server, drop-in replacement for EsounD.
 PipeWire, a server for multimedia routing and pipeline processing.

Synthesizers 

 Amsynth
 DIN Is Noise (din), software synthesiser, musical instrument, uses computer mouse as bow.
 FluidSynth, with the interface QSynth.
 Gnaural, binaural beat and pink noise synthesizer.
 LMMS, tracker, sequencer, synthesizer.
 Pianoteq, digital physical modeling of pianos and related instruments.
 TiMidity, Play-convert MIDI files as-to PCM
 WildMIDI, Some alternative to TiMidity
 FluidSynth, a free open source software synthesizer which converts MIDI note data into an audio signal
 Yoshimi, software synthesizer.
 ZynAddSubFX, software synthesizer.

Effects processing 
 PulseEffects, effects processing for input and output audio streams with PulseAudio.
 FreqTweak, real-time audio processing with spectral displays.
 Linux Audio Developers Simple Plug-in API (LADSPA).
 Disposable Soft Synth Interface (DSSI), a virtual instrument (software synthesizer) plug-in architecture.
 Sound eXchange (SoX), the audio Swiss Army knife.
 LV2, is the new audio Linux standard for plug-ins.

Format transcoding 
 fre:ac
 OggConvert
 Sound eXchange (SoX)
 GNOME SoundConverter

Radio broadcasting 
Airtime, an automation system for radio stations.
Campcaster (discontinued), an automation system for radio stations.
Icecast, free server software for streaming multimedia.
OpenBroadcaster, LPFM IPTV broadcast automation tools.

Radio listening 
 Streamtuner, browse and listen to hundreds of streamed radio stations.

Score and tablature edition software 
 Frescobaldi, score writer
 Denemo, score editor
 LilyPond, score typesetter
 NoteEdit, score writer
 MuseScore, score writer
 TuxGuitar, a tabulature editor, score writer and player oriented for guitarists.

See also 
 Comparison of free software for audio
 List of music software

References 

 
Linux audio software